Koivusaari metro station is a station located underwater on the Länsimetro extension of the Helsinki Metro.

Although the metro station is named after Koivusaari, the westernmost island in Helsinki, it is actually located on the extreme western edge of the Lauttasaari island. It is located 2.3 kilometres east from Keilaniemi metro station and 1.6 kilometres west from Lauttasaari metro station.

The eastern entrance to Koivusaari metro station is located on Sotkatie in Lauttasaari. The western entrance, on the island of Koivusaari itself, had not been taken into use when the Länsimetro was completed, it is waiting until land use in the area has developed enough.

History
Koivusaari metro station opened in 2017 as part of the Länsimetro extension, and is currently the only metro station in the world located under the sea. The station has  escalators and funicular-style elevators. It is the westernmost metro station in Helsinki. The following station to the west, Keilaniemi, is located in Espoo.

The escalators at Koivusaari metro station are the longest in the entire country in Finland. On weekdays Koivusaari metro station is visited by 4,600 passengers per day on average, which is the lowest number among all stations of Länsimetro and the entire Helsinki Metro.

Koivusaari metro station was temporarily closed for refurbishment – to fix cracks found in the concrete floor of the station – on 1 June 2020 and reopened in August.

Gallery

References

External links
 
Länsimetro work in progress

Helsinki Metro stations
2017 establishments in Finland
Lauttasaari